Several ships of the Royal Danish-Norwegian Navy (1509–1814) and the Royal Danish Navy have borne the name Najaden after the mythological water spirit, including: 
 , a frigate (1796–1807)
 , a frigate (1811–1812)
 , a corvette (1820–1852)
 , a corvette (1854–1865)
 , a submarine (1913–1931)
 , a torpedo boat (1947–1966), originally named Najaden
 , a patrol vessel (Danish: bevogtningsfartøj) (1963–1991)

See also
 
 Najaden, 1858 to 1907 - a Norwegian commercial brig (history)
 STS Kapitan Borchardt, 1918, a gaff-schooner called Najaden til 2011

References

Royal Danish Navy ship names